Pelican Park can refer to:

 Jim Spooner Field, Pensacola, Florida
 Pelican Park, a recreational park in St. Tammany Parish, Louisiana
 Pelican Park, former stadium of the New Orleans Pelicans baseball team in the early 20th century
 Pelican Park, a rugby ground in Wellington, South Africa